The Florida Launch were a professional men's field lacrosse team based in Boca Raton, Florida. They joined Major League Lacrosse (MLL) as an expansion team for the 2014 season until 2019. The team played its home games at Florida Atlantic University Stadium. The team was owned by Jim Davis, chairman of New Balance, an early investor in the MLL.

Franchise history

2014–2016: New beginnings
In November 2013, MLL granted an expansion franchise to Palm Beach County, Florida for the 2014 MLL Season. The formation of the Launch coincides with the dissolution of the Hamilton Nationals, and former National players have become members of the inaugural Launch squad. Former Denver Outlaws assistant Stan Ross was named as the team's first coach.

Ross faced his former team in the Launch's inaugural game on Saturday, April 26, 2014 in their home opener. The Launch lost their first game to the Outlaws 14-10. Josh Amidon scored the first goal in franchise history. The team's first victory came in their second game, an 11-8 win over the Charlotte Hounds.

After coaching the Launch to a combined 13-29 record over their first three seasons, Ross resigned on November 17, 2016. Tom Mariano, former assistant coach for the Chesapeake Bayhawks, was announced his replacement on December 7.

2017: Playoff breakthrough

When the 2017 schedule was announced on November 15, 2016, the Launch also announced that their first three homes games would be played at various cities in Florida as a part of their 2017 Florida Tour to grow the game of lacrosse throughout the state. Due to field renovations at FAU Stadium finishing sooner than expected, the Launch scheduled the home opener on May 13, 2017 after playing two games at Spec Martin Stadium in DeLand, Fla.

The Launch started the 2017 season with an unimpressive 2-3 record. On May 28, with the first pick in the year's collegiate draft, the Launch selected Dylan Molloy, attack from Brown University. Molloy, originally from Long Island, boasted record break numbers at Brown University. Following the pick, the Launch rattled off three straight victories, including two over the New York Lizards to match their franchise high for victories in a season with five (only eight games into the season). The Launch would then go on to lose three of their next four, including an embarrassing 17-4 defeat to the Atlanta Blaze.

On July 29, the Launch entered their last game of the season controlling their own postseason fate. At 7-6, they entered Harvard Stadium to play the last-place Boston Cannons, who defeated them in the first week of the season in overtime. The Launch controlled the game for over 37 minutes, scoring the first six goals of the game and led 16-6 more than midway into the third quarter. The tides turned quickly however, and the Cannons rattled off 11 straight goals to take a 17-16 lead with 8:43 remaining. The Launch were able to recover though. Kieran McArdle tied the game a minute and a half later, and rookie Nick Mariano won the game with a goal with less than five minutes to go. The Launch would finally clinch their first postseason berth in team history with an 18-17 win over the feisty Cannons and head into the final week of the season with a bye.

On August 12, the Launch played the Ohio Machine at Fortress Obetz in the team's first ever playoff appearance. Florida kept it close for much of the game, but the eventual-champion Machine were able to separate themselves and defeat the Launch, 18-13.

The next season, the Launch were not able to replicate their success. Despite getting off to a 2-1 start including a dominating 16-7 win over the eventual champion Denver Outlaws, the team finished the season with a disappointing 5-9 record. Dylan Molloy led the team in goals with 41.

2019: MLL contraction and Launch folding 
On April 1, 2019, the Florida Launch released a statement indicating that the team was folding as a result of a contraction of Major League Lacrosse from nine teams to six.

Season-by-season

Roster

updated 2018-07-16

Head coaching history

Award winners

Most Valuable Player
 Casey Powell: 2014

Rookie of the Year
 Kieran McArdle: 2014

Coach of the Year
 Tom Mariano: 2017

Defensive Player of the Year
 Tucker Durkin: 2017

Offensive Player of the Year
 Casey Powell: 2014

MLL Collegiate Draft

First round selections
 2014: Kieran McArdle, St. John's (4th overall)
 2015: Lyle Thompson, Albany (1st overall); Connor Buczek, Cornell (2nd overall)
 2016: Matt Landis, Notre Dame (3rd overall)
 2017: Dylan Molloy, Brown (1st overall); Nick Mariano, Syracuse (4th overall); Sergio Salcido, Syracuse (8th overall)
 2018: Jules Heningburg, Rutgers (7th overall)

References

External links

2017 Media Guide

 
Lacrosse clubs established in 2013
Lacrosse clubs disestablished in 2019
Sports in the Miami metropolitan area
Lacrosse teams in Florida
2013 establishments in Florida
2019 disestablishments in Florida